Mahabhashya (IAST: , , "great commentary"), attributed to Patañjali, is a commentary on selected rules of Sanskrit grammar from Pāṇini's treatise, the Aṣṭādhyāyī, as well as Kātyāyana's Vārttika-sūtra, an elaboration of Pāṇini's grammar. It is dated to the 2nd century BCE.

Overview 

Patañjali is one of the three most famous Sanskrit grammarians of ancient India, other two being Pāṇini and Kātyāyana who preceded Patañjali (dated to c. 150 BCE). Kātyāyana's work (nearly 1500 verses on ) is available only through references in Patañjali's work.

It was with Patañjali that the Indian tradition of language scholarship reached its definite form. The system thus established is extremely detailed as to shiksha (phonology, including accent) and vyakarana (grammar and morphology). Syntax is scarcely touched, but nirukta (etymology) is discussed, and these etymologies naturally lead to semantic explanations. People interpret his work to be a defence of Pāṇini, whose Sutras are elaborated meaningfully. Patañjali also examines Kātyāyana rather severely. But the main contributions of Patañjali lies in the treatment of the principles of grammar enunciated by him.

Kātyāyana introduced semantic discourse into grammar, which was further elaborated by Patañjali to such an extent that  can be called a mix of grammar as such as well as a philosophy of grammar. Kāśika-vritti by Jayāditya and Vāmana (mentioned by Itsing) included viewpoints of other grammarians also which did not conform to Patañjali's views.

The extant Mahābhāṣya text is available on 1228 of the 3981 sūtras of the Aṣṭādhyāyī. The Mahābhāṣya is divided into eighty five sections called āhnika consisting of subject matter of one day's study each.

Mentions and commentaries
Satyapriya Tirtha (c. 1701 – c. 1744), a peetadhipathi of Uttaradi Matha belonging to Dvaita school of Vedanta wrote a commentary on Mahābhāṣya named Mahābhāṣya Vivarana.

References

Bibliography

Editions 
 In Sanskrit.

Secondary Literature

Further reading 
 The  of Patañjali with annotation (Ahnikas I–IV), Translated by Surendranath Dasgupta, Published by Indian Council of Philosophical Research
  of Patañjali (Śrīmadbhagavat-patañjali-muni- Prakāśana, 1987–1988., OCLC: 20995237
 Bronkhorst, Johannes, 1992. Pāṇini's View of Meaning and its Western Counterpart. In, Maxim Stamenov (ed.) Current Advances in Semantic Theory. Amsterdam: J. Benjamins. (455–64)
 Scharfe, Hartmut, 1977. Grammatical Literature. Vol. V, Fasc. 2, History of Indian Literature, (ed.) Jan Gonda. Wiesbaden: Otto Harrassowitz.
 Staal, J.F. (ed.), 1985. A Reader on Sanskrit Grammarians. Delhi: Motilal Banarasidass.

External links
 vyaakaraN mahaabhaaShya in Devanagari.
 vyaakaraN mahaabhaaShya in CSX at GRETIL.
 VyaakaraN Mahaabhaashya in Roman transliteration

Vyakarana
Sanskrit texts
Ancient Indian grammar works